John Huffman may refer to:
 John W. Huffman, professor of organic chemistry
 John Huffman (politician), member of the Oregon House of Representatives
 John Huffman (fencer), American Olympic fencer

See also
 John Hoffman (disambiguation)